Gedling Country Park is a country park in Gedling, Nottingham, England.

History
The park is on the grounds of the former Gedling Colliery, which closed in 1991 and was subsequently used as a civic amenity site before closing to the public. The site was converted into the present country park in 2015. A café and visitor centre, dubbed Café 1899, were opened at the park in 2017 at a cost of £1.5 million, alongside a children's playground themed to the Colliery constructed by playground equipment manufacturer Proludic, at the cost of £200,000.

Facilities
There is a diversity of wildlife, mining heritage, footpaths, trails and woodland. There is bird watching and heritage trails. A Parkrun takes place in the park every Saturday morning at 9am, the course is an undulating single lap figure of eight.  A friendly three legged cat called Juno spends a lot of his time saying hello to visitors to the park, chasing dogs and eating chicken sandwiches.

References

External links
Friends of Gedling Country Park website

Country parks in Nottinghamshire
Gedling